Teenage Wolfpack is a 1956 German crime drama film directed by Georg Tressler. The film is also known as Wolfpack in the United Kingdom. It was shot at the Spandau Studios in West Berlin

Plot summary 
The drama of a youthful triangle among gang leader Freddy (Horst Buchholz), his brother Jan (Christian Doermer), and bad girl Cissy (Karin Baal), in one of the first considerations of juvenile delinquency in post-war West Germany.

Cast 
Horst Buchholz (credited as Henry Bookholt in the US release) as Freddy Borchert
Karin Baal as Sissy Bohl
Christian Doermer as Jan Borchert
Jo Herbst as Günther
Viktoria von Ballasko as Mutter Borchert
Stanislav Ledinek as Antonio Garezzo
Mario Ahrens as Mario
Manfred Hoffmann as Klaus
Hans-Joachim Ketzlin as Willi
Kalle Gaffkus as Kudde
Wolfgang Heyer as Woelfi
Paul Wagner as Vater Borchert
Eduard Wandrey as Pepe Garezzo
Friedrich Joloff as Theo
Ruth Mueller as Rita
Egon Vogel as Prillinger
Gudrun Kruger
Ingrid Kirsch
Oskar Lindner
Marion Lebens
Editha Horn
Heinz Palm
Paul Bladschun

Soundtrack 
 Mister Martin's Band - "In Chicago"
 Mister Martin's Band - "Sissy Blues"
 Mister Martin's Band - "Mister Martin's Hop"
 Mister Martin's Band - "Swing Party"

External links 

 (English dialogue)
 (German dialogue)

1956 films
1956 crime drama films
German teen drama films
German crime drama films
West German films
1950s German-language films
Films directed by Georg Tressler
1950s teen drama films
Films set in Berlin
German black-and-white films
1950s gang films
1950s German films
Films shot at Spandau Studios
Films shot in Berlin